National Nationwide League Division One (formerly known as Nigerian Amateur League) is the third level of club football in Nigeria. Every year, up to eight teams are promoted to the Professional Division One.

Starting in 2012, the league changed its name from the Amateur League and will promote three teams per division instead of two. This was after a long delay in confirming promotions from the prior year due to  teams' protests.

As the "largest grassroots league in the world", promotion and relegation are not guaranteed. Most of the teams are sponsored by private citizens or Local Govt. Areas and funding at this level is minimal. Any team eligible to move to the National Division 1 must qualify for a Professional League license and commit to the increased spending. After the 2007/08 season  Dankalat FC of Kano won promotion, but instead sold their slot in Division 1A to Calabar Rovers. (Dankalat would eventually sell their slot in the 2012 Professional League to Nembe City FC). For the 2013 season, FC Ebedei and Makwada remained in the Nationwide league and sold their promotion slots after winning their divisions. Bolowotan, who also won promotion, sold their slot after 9 games in the professional level.

After the 2016 season, the league doubled in size to 80 teams. Teams will play in five-team divisions, with the winner of each division playing the corresponding Group for the one promotion slot.

The 2019/20 season was cancelled and affected by the COVID-19 that forced all activities to a stop. Hence, no promotion or relegation of teams.

Current season
The 2021/Season will have 132 teams playing in sixteen groups in sixteen venues (originally eight) and began the first weekend of March.

Ikenne Group 1
Buruj FC, Lagos State
FC Bulmaro, Lagos State
Gbagada FC, Lagos State
Iganmu FC, Lagos State
Destiny Boys FC, Lagos State
AS Racine FC, Lagos State
BYT (Best Young Talents) FC, Lagos State
Emmydinho FC, Lagos State
Magate FC, Lagos State
Zenith Emperor FC, Lagos State
Ikenne Group 2
Spartans FC, Lagos State
Jossy FC, Lagos State
Messiah FC, Lagos State
Collins Edwin FC, Lagos State
Valiant FC, Lagos State
Cincinnati FC, Lagos State
Tradesafe Sports FC, Lagos State
First Bank F.C., Lagos State
Madiba FC, Lagos State
Ado Ekiti Group 1 (Kayode Olufemi Stadium)
Ijebu United, Ogun State
Olumo United, Ogun State
Dino SC, Ogun State
Pacesetters FC, Oyo State
Easy-Well FC, Ogun State
OSOPADEC (Ondo State Oil Producing Areas Development Commission,) FC, Ondo State
Offa FC, Kwara State
Imperial FC, Ogun State
Ado Ekiti Group 2 (Federal Polytechnic Stadium)
Olisa FC, Ogun State
Juvenile FC, Ogun State
Almar FC, Ogun State
Akure City FC, Ondo State
Abray Sports FC, Kwara State
SGFC Athletics SC, Kwara State
Estate FC, Ogun State
Gidado FC, Kwara State
Positive Football Academy, Oyo State

Ilorin Group 1 (Kwara FA Stadium)

Kaduna United F.C.
Ilorin Group 1 (Ilorin Stadium)

Univ. of Port Harcourt

Calabar (Esuene Stadium)

Jos Group 1 (Rwang Pam Stadium) 

Jos Group 2 (Zaria Road Stadium)

Ngor-Okpala Stadium

Okigwe Stadium

Bauchi Group 1 (AT Bello Stadium)

Bauchi Group 2 (Federal Polytechnic Stadium)

Zaria Group

Kaduna Group (Ranchers Bees Stadium)
 ASDC FC, ABuja
Supreme Court FC, Abuja
Police Machine FC, Abuja
 FC Chika Malami, Kebbi State
 Zoo United, Kano State
 Ramcy United, Kano State
 Katsina Juniors, Katsina State

2019
The 2019 season started 25 May. Thirteen of the teams are feeder teams of NPFL or National League teams.

Group A1-
First Bank F.C. of Lagos
Collins Edwin F.C. – Lagos 
FC Bulmaro – Lagos State
Gbagada FC – Lagos State
B. Angels FC. – Lagos State
Iganmu F.C. - Lagos State
Group A2- 
FC Ebedei
ODIC FC of Lagos
Destiny Boys of Ikorodu
Olisa FC. – Ogun State
Madiba FC – Lagos State
AS Racine – Lagos State

Group B1-
Juvenile FC of Ilaro
Magate FC of Lagos
Dominion Pacesetter – Ogun State
Nordic Academy – Ogun State
Nilayo FC- Ogun State
Joy Cometh FC – Ogun State
Group B2-
Almar FC of Ijebu-Ode
Spartan FC Lagos
Zenith Emperors FC – Lagos State
Abray Sports FC – Lagos State
Yobo FC – Lagos State
Goodland FC of Lagos

Group C1-
Akure City FC
Rising Stars F.C. Akure
Osopadec FC – Ondo State
Pace Setters FC – Oyo State
Ajiroba Ooni FC. – Osun State
Group C2-
Offa FC – Kwara State
Gidado FC. – Kwara State
Phoenix ASC FC. – Ekiti State
Wasiu Alabelewe FC – Osun State
Fashmong FC – Ekiti State

Group D1-
Bussdor United F.C. – Imo State
Akajiobi United FC – Imo State
Right To Win FC. – Abia State
Heartland FC Feeders – Imo State
Ifeanyi Ubah Feeders
Group D2-
Crimebusters FC of Enugu (Enugu Police)
Enyimba Feeders of Aba
Enugu Rangers Feeders
Urashi United- Imo State
Udala FC – Anambra State

Group E1-
Cofine FC- Akwa Ibom
Cynosure FC of Port Harcourt
SKE- Rivers State
Papilo FC. – Imo State
Ben Ayade FC – Cross River State

Group E2- 
Nembe City F.C.
J. Atete Feeders of Warri
Vermard Africa FC of Enugu
Fatai Dragon – Edo State
Isoko United – Delta State
Ika Rangers-Delta State
Group F1-
Aklosendi Feeders – Nasarawa State
Bida Lions
Niger Tornadoes Juniors
FWC FC. – FCT
Supreme Court FC of Abuja
Vet Rovers of Vom
Wazobia FC of Abuja
Group F2-
Oyah Sports FC – Niger State
Basira FC. – Nasarawa State
Bityong FC. – Plateau State
FC Solid Jos. – Plateau State
Liberty FC. – Benue State

Group G1-
Haifa FC. – Jigawa State
Kebbi United FC – Kebbi State
TSM FC. – Kaduna State
Junior Danburan. – Katsina State
Rarara FC. – Katsina State.
Katsina United Juniors
K.J. United of Kaduna

Group G2-
Sky Limit FC of Kano
Shekarau Babes – Kano State
Zoo United. – Kano State
Kano Pillars Juniors – Kano State
Ramcy United. – Kano State
Sky Academy. – Kano State

Group H1-
Mighty Jets Feeders 
Misau FC. – Bauchi State
Flash Flamingoes of Gombe
Wikki Feeders
Zabgai FC of Bauchi.

Group H2-
DMD FC of Biu
Doma United of Gombe
Galaxy Transport FC – Borno State
Gombe Warriors FC
El-Kanemi Feeders
Super Pillars FC. – Gombe State

References 

3
Third level football leagues in Africa
Sports leagues established in 2001
2001 establishments in Nigeria